Richard Stone (1950 – 1 May 2018), known as Charlie Stone, was an English rugby union and professional rugby league footballer who played in the 1970s and 1980s.

Background
Charlie Stone's birth was registered in Pontefract district, West Riding of Yorkshire in the third quarter of 1950, and he died aged .

Featherstone Rovers

Notable matches in which he played include two consecutive Challenge Cup finals in 1973 and 1974. In the first he played  in Featherstone Rovers' 33–14 victory over Bradford Northern in the 1973 Challenge Cup Final  at Wembley Stadium, London on Saturday 12 May 1973, in front of a crowd of 72,395. In the 1974 final he was asubstitute (replacing  Jimmy Thompson) in the 9–24 defeat by Warrington Wembley Stadium on Saturday 11 May 1974, in front of a crowd of 77,400.

Two County Cup Final appearances followed playing right- in Featherstone Rovers' 12–16 defeat by Leeds in the 1976 Yorkshire Cup Final  at Headingley, Leeds on Saturday 16 October 1976 and playing right- (replaced by substitute Peter Smith) in the 7–17 defeat by Castleford in the 1977 Yorkshire Cup Final at Headingley on Saturday 15 October 1977.

Hull F.C.
In 1978 Stone joined Hull F.C. and went on to make 188 appearances and scoring 8 tries during 5 years at the club.

The first honours while at Hull were in the 13–3 victory over Hull Kingston Rovers in the 1979 BBC2 Floodlit Trophy Final  at The Boulevard, Kingston upon Hull on Tuesday 18 December 1979. With Hull he made a further three Challenge Cup Final appearances; playing right- in Hull FC's 5–10 defeat by Hull Kingston Rovers in the 1980 Challenge Cup Final at Wembley on Saturday 3 May 1980, in front of a crowd of 95,000 snd two years later played right- in the 14–14 draw with Widnes in the 1982 Final at Wembley  on Saturday 1 May 1982, in front of a crowd of 92,147, and played right- in the 18–9 victory over Widnes in the replay  at Elland Road, Leeds on Wednesday 19 May 1982, in front of a crowd of 41,171. Finally in 1983 he played right- in Hull's 14-12 defeat by Featherstone Rovers at Wembley in front of a crowd of 84,869 

In between the two Challenge Cup finals he played right- in a 12–4 victory over Hull Kingston Rovers in the 1981–82 John Player Trophy Final Headingley Rugby Stadium  on Saturday 23 January 1982. Stone captained the team on that day and was sent off 5 minutes from the end along with Roy Holdstock from the opposition. In a controversial moment Stone was allowed up to lift the trophy, despite the early exit from the game. In 1982 he played right- in the 18–7 victory over Bradford Northern in the 1982 Yorkshire Cup Final at Elland Road on Saturday 2 October 1982.

Featherstone Rovers, second spell
At the end of the 1984/85 season Stone rejoined Featherstone for a second time during which he played a further 21 games, scoring one try before retiring.  Stone was inducted into Featherstone Rovers Hall of Fame in 2016.

International honours
Stone won a cap for England as an interchange/substitute while at Featherstone Rovers in 1975 against Australia.  Stone was selected for the 1984 Great Britain Lions tour to Australasia in 1984 and while he played in 12 tour matches he was not selected for any of the test matches.

County honours
Charlie Stone won caps for Yorkshire while at Featherstone Rovers; during the 1973–74 season against Cumbria and Lancashire.

References

External links
Stats → PastPlayers → S at hullfc.com
Statistics at hullfc.com

1950 births
2018 deaths
England national rugby league team players
English rugby league players
English rugby union players
Featherstone Rovers players
Hull F.C. captains
Hull F.C. players
Rugby league players from Pontefract
Rugby league props
Rugby league second-rows
Rugby union players from Pontefract
Yorkshire rugby league team players